Simon Doonan (born 1952) is the Creative Ambassador-at-Large of the New York City-based clothing store Barneys.

Biography
Doonan comes from the English town of Reading. His first retail job was a summer position at Heelas, a department store in Reading, now owned by the John Lewis Partnership. After returning to work at the same store after university, he first got involved in the art of window dressing. He later left Reading for London and dressed windows at Aquascutum before moving to Nutters of Savile Row.

Invited to dress his windows by the proprietor of Maxfield, a department store in Los Angeles, Doonan moved to the United States in 1978. He joined the Barneys staff in 1986 as a window dresser.

He worked at Barneys until it closed in 2019. He writes a column on style for Slate.

In his book, Eccentric Glamour, he decried porno chic in Western society in general. Interviewed for an article for the New York Daily News, he said, "There are two horribly worrying trends!  Celebrities are becoming so gun-shy that there is no diversity, no sense of fun on the red carpet. There's no experimentation – which is incredibly important to fashion."  On "porno chic," (the second trend) he said, "Imagine if you said to people 20 years ago that, in 2008, a significant number of women would be going around dressing like porno stars with fake hooters and butt cracks showing? No one would have believed you."

In September 2008, he married his husband, designer Jonathan Adler, in California.

Appearances
Doonan has made appearances on VH1's I Love the series, offering social commentary on each decade.

He has also been a guest star on America's Next Top Model seasons 2, 3, and 5 to teach the models about style.

Doonan has appeared on Bravo's Fashion Hunters to authenticate an Issey Miyake piece.

Doonan's memoir Beautiful People has been adapted for TV and began airing on BBC Two in the UK on 2 October 2008 as Beautiful People.

For The Moth podcasts, he read "Fear of Squat" on 20 September 2006 and "Every Expense was Spared" on 9 February 2012 about his wedding to Adler.

Doonan appeared as a judge on Iron Chef America for Battle Sparkling Wine.

In Gossip Girl'''s fifth season (third episode: "The Jewel of Denial"), he escorted Blair Waldorf on Jenny Packham's show.

Doonan used to dress up as the UK's Queen Elizabeth II, and impersonate her at public appearances, and has written about being born in the same year as Elizabeth's accession to the throne (1952) and his affinity with Elizabeth's pet name, "Brenda".

In January 2013, Doonan made a cameo in an Alexander Wang advertisement. The advertisement takes place in Wang's flagship store in New York, where Doonan is falsely accused by Anjelah Johnson's character Bon Qui Qui for trying to steal a handbag.

He is also a judge for the NBC show Making It hosted by Amy Poehler and Nick Offerman.

See also
Savile Row
Beautiful People

BibliographyConfessions of a Window Dresser: Tales from the Life of Fashion (2001)  (Memoir)Wacky Chicks: Life Lessons from Fearlessly Inappropriate and Fabulously Eccentric Women (2005) Simon & Schuster Beautiful People (also published as Nasty: My Family and Other Glamorous Varmints) (2005) Eccentric Glamour: Creating an Insanely More Fabulous You (2008) Simon & Schuster Gay Men Don't Get Fat (2012) Blue Rider Press Soccer Style: The Magic and Madness'' (2018) Laurence King Publishing

References

External links
 

1952 births
Living people
English expatriates in the United States
English LGBT people
LGBT fashion designers
People from Reading, Berkshire
English businesspeople
English columnists
English fashion designers
Window dressers